New River (also Newriver) is an unincorporated community in Scott County, Tennessee, United States.

Josephus S. Cecil (1878–1940), United States Army officer and recipient of the Medal of Honor for actions during the Philippine–American War, was born in New River.

Notes

Unincorporated communities in Scott County, Tennessee
Unincorporated communities in Tennessee